Rune Johnsson (born 28 May 1933) is a Swedish wrestler. He competed in the men's Greco-Roman lightweight at the 1964 Summer Olympics.

References

External links
 

1933 births
Living people
Swedish male sport wrestlers
Olympic wrestlers of Sweden
Wrestlers at the 1964 Summer Olympics
People from Sundsvall
Sportspeople from Västernorrland County